Mass murder is the act of murdering a number of people, typically simultaneously or over a relatively short period of time and in close geographic proximity. The United States Congress defines mass killings as the killings of three or more persons during an event with no "cooling-off period" between the homicides. A mass murder typically occurs in a single location where one or more persons kill several others.

A mass murder may be committed by individuals or organizations whereas a spree killing is committed by one or two individuals. Mass murderers differ from spree killers, who kill at two or more locations with almost no time break between murders and are not defined by the number of victims, and serial killers, who may kill people over long periods of time. The incidents of mass shootings are continuing to increase.

By terrorist organizations
Many terrorist groups in recent times have used the tactic of killing many victims to fulfill their political aims. Such incidents have included:

 33 civilians killed in the Başbağlar attack by the PKK on July 5, 1993;
 19 American airmen killed in the Khobar Towers bombing on June 25, 1996, by Hezbollah Al-Hejaz;
 2,977 people killed by Al-Qaeda in the September 11 attacks of 2001;  
 193 people killed in the 2004 Madrid train bombings by Al-Qaeda;
 334 (including 186 children) killed in the Beslan school siege on September 1–4, 2004 by Riyad-us Saliheen;
 52 killed in the 2005 London bombings by Islamic terrorists; 
 166 killed in the 2008 Mumbai attacks by Lashkar-e-Taiba;
 156 children and teachers killed in the 2014 Peshawar school massacre by Taliban in Peshawar, Pakistan;
 130 killed as the result of the November 2015 Paris attacks by ISIS
 1,095 killed in the Camp Speicher massacre by ISIS

By cults
Certain cults, especially religious cults, have committed a number of mass killings and mass murder–suicides.

 Jim Jones' Peoples Temple in Jonestown, Guyana, where 919 people died in 1978
 Order of the Solar Temple in Canada, Switzerland, and France, where 75 died in 1994, 1995, and 1997
 Shoko Asahara's Aum Shinrikyo, which killed 14 in Tokyo, Japan, in 1995 
 Marshall Applewhite's Heaven's Gate in San Diego, California, where 39 died in 1997 
 Movement for the Restoration of the Ten Commandments of God in Uganda, where 778 died in 2000

By individuals

Mass murderers may be categorized into killers of family, of coworkers, of students, and of random strangers. Their motives vary. One motivation for mass murder is revenge, but other motivations are possible, including the need for attention or fame.

Acting on the orders of Joseph Stalin, Vasili Blokhin's war crime  killing of 7,000 Polish prisoners of war, shot over 28 days, was one of the most organized and protracted mass murders by a single individual on record.

Law enforcement response and countermeasures
Analysis of the Columbine High School massacre and other incidents where law enforcement officers waited for backup has resulted in changed recommendations regarding what victims, bystanders, and law enforcement officers should do. In the Columbine shooting, the perpetrators, Eric Harris and Dylan Klebold, were able to murder 13 people, then commit suicide before the first SWAT team even entered the school. Average response time by law enforcement to a mass shooting is typically much longer than the time the shooter is engaged in killing. While immediate action may be extremely dangerous, it could save lives which would be lost if victims and bystanders involved in the situation remain passive, or law enforcement response is delayed until overwhelming force can be deployed. It is recommended that victims and bystanders involved in the incident take active steps to flee, hide, or fight the shooter and that law enforcement officers present or first arriving at the scene attempt immediately to engage the shooter. In many instances, immediate action by victims, bystanders, or law enforcement officers has saved lives. However, law enforcement programs and actions have so far been unable to reduce the total number of incidents. In 2020, a record number of 600 mass shootings occurred.

Criticism as an analytical category
Commentators have pointed out that there are a wide variety of ways that homicides with more than several victims might be classified. Such incidents can be, and have been even in recent decades, classified many different ways including "as a mass shooting; as a school shooting; as mass murder; as workplace violence...; as a crime involving an assault rifle; as a case of a mentally ill person committing acts of violence; and so on."

How such rarely occurring incidents of homicide are classified tends to change significantly with time. "In the 1960s and 1970s,... it was understood that the key feature of [a number of such] cases was a high body count. These early discussions of mass murder lumped together [a variety of] cases that varied along what would come to be seen as important dimensions:
 Time: Did the killings occur more or less simultaneously, or did they extend over several days, months, or years?
 Place: Did the killings occur in a single location, or in a variety of places?
 Method: How were the victims killed?"
In the late decades of the Twentieth Century and early years of the 2000s, the most popular classifications moved to include method, time and place.

While such classifications may assist in gaining human meaning, as human-selected categories, they can also carry significant meaning and reflect a particular point of view of the commentator who assigned the descriptor.

See also

 Crimes against humanity
 Gun violence
 List of rampage killers
 Mass destruction
 Mass grave
 School shooting
 Suicide attack
 Terrorism
 War crime
 List of wars and anthropogenic disasters by death toll

References

External links

 What makes a Mass Killer?
 Mass Murder: A Small Person's Way to Immortality
 Mass shootings interactive map
 Online Encyclopedia of Mass Violence
 The real causes of mass murder by James Alan Fox. Boston.com, January 16, 2011.

(murder of 4 or more people)

Murder